The  ("Golden Grole";) is one of the oldest Italian film awards.

The award was founded in 1953 and ran until 1981; after some years of hiatus, it was relaunched in 1989 by journalist Maurizio Costanzo and, above all, by the film critic  (1990–2001).  The ceremonies are held in Saint-Vincent, Aosta Valley.

References

External links 
 

Film festivals in Italy
Tourist attractions in Aosta Valley
Aosta Valley
1953 establishments in Italy